Hiru may refer to:
Mount Hiru, mountain in Japan
Hiru FM, Sri Lankan radio station
Hiru, Hormozgan, a village in Iran
Hiru, Lorestan, a village in Iran